Olga Akimova (born 28 May 1983 in Tashkent) is a former competitive ice dancer for Uzbekistan. With former partner Alexander Shakalov, she is the 2004-2005 Uzbek national champion. She previously competed with Andrei Driganov and Ramil Sarkulov. She is an ISU ice dancing technical specialist for Ukraine.

Programs

With Shakalov

With Sarkulov

With Driganov

Results 
GP: Grand Prix; JGP: Junior Grand Prix

With Shakalov

With Sarkulov

With Driganov

References

External links 

 
 
 

Uzbekistani female ice dancers
1983 births
Living people
Sportspeople from Tashkent
Uzbekistani emigrants to Ukraine
Dancers from Tashkent